El Rancho Airport  is an airstrip in the pampa of the Beni Department in Bolivia. The runway is near a bend of the Mamoré River.

See also

Transport in Bolivia
List of airports in Bolivia

References

External links 
OpenStreetMap - El Rancho
OurAirports - El Rancho
Fallingrain - El Rancho Airport
HERE/Nokia - El Rancho

Airports in Beni Department